The 1904 United States presidential election in Delaware took place on November 8, 1904. All contemporary 45 states were part of the 1904 United States presidential election. State voters chose three electors to the Electoral College, which selected the president and vice president.

Delaware was won by the Republican nominees, incumbent President Theodore Roosevelt of New York and his running mate Charles W. Fairbanks of Indiana.

Results

See also
 United States presidential elections in Delaware

References

Notes

Delaware
1904
1904 Delaware elections